New Sweden was a Swedish colony along the Delaware River in North America.

New Sweden may also refer to:

New Sweden, Idaho
New Sweden School
New Sweden, Maine
New Sweden Township, Nicollet County, Minnesota
New Sweden, Texas, remnants of a Swedish settlement near Austin
New Sweden (yacht), a 12-metre-class yacht

See also
New Sweden Farmstead Museum, New Jersey
Sweden (disambiguation)
Sverige (disambiguation)